Giannis Gerontas (born 23 January 1962) is a Greek weightlifter. He competed in the men's heavyweight II event at the 1984 Summer Olympics.

References

1962 births
Living people
Greek male weightlifters
Olympic weightlifters of Greece
Weightlifters at the 1984 Summer Olympics
Place of birth missing (living people)
20th-century Greek people